Ptichodis pacalis is a moth of the family Erebidae. It is found in North America, where it has been recorded from Florida and Georgia.

The wingspan is about 27 mm. Adults have been recorded on wing from February to June.

References

Moths described in 1858
Ptichodis
Moths of North America